Marko Nešić (Serbian Cyrillic: Марко Нешић) (March 2, 1873 – April 30, 1938) was a Serbian composer and tamburitza musician. He composed a number of folks songs for tambura, such as Neven Kolo, Žabaljka, Bogata sam imam svega & Đuvegije gde ste da ste.

Biography and work 
Marko Nešić took part in a wide range of activities creating great cultural and social impacts in his time, but is still most remembered for his stylistic harmonization of folk songs from Vojvodina, which were published at his own expense and sent to tamburica groups and orchestras across Serbia. He played the tamburica (prim) and šargija and was the bandmaster of several tamburica orchestras including: Neven, Srbadija, Bratimstvo, Beli Orao and Excelsior.
The famous composer and tamburica player from Novi sad issued a "School for the tamburica", taught shoemaking, craft printing and carpentry, but since 1890 he was completely devoted to careers as a musician. He has written over 200 songs and instrumental compositions, many of which are considered folk songs. These include but are not limited to: "Žabaljka", "Bogata sam, imam svega" (I am rich, I have everything), "Dones' mi vina krčmarice" (Bring me the wine, bartender), "Idem kući" (I'm going home), "Kukuruzi već se beru" (The corn is already being harvested),"Kad sam bio mlađan lovac ja" (When I was a young hunter), "Neven Kolo", "Đuvegije gde ste da ste" (Grooms, wherever you are), "Majka me psuje" (My mother curses at me), "Prolaze noći" (The nights go by) and
"Biće skoro propast sveta" (Soon the world will collapse), which served as the leitmotif for the cult film Žika Pavlović, and others ..
With the tamburica orchestra of Vasa Jovanovic, Nešić has appeared in most major cities of Europe and became a supporter of Esperanto. He is the founder of Esperanto Society in Novi Sad, which carries his name.
Nešić was a great supporter of the labor movement, when he died on 30 April 1938, just before May Day (International Workers' Day), at his funeral on Almaška cemetery in Novi Sad an imposing group of workers gathered with a large number of wreaths as a last salute from the comrades of various labor organisations.

References 

 "Sa pesmom u narodu" almanax,Tiski Cvet 2009, Novi Sad
 "Vojvođanska tamburica", Sava Vukosavljev, Matica Srpska 1990. Novi Sad
 "Žice tamburice", Savez muzičkih društava Vojvodine 1985. Novi Sad

See also 
 NEVEN Serbian Craftsmen Singing Society
 Music of Serbia
 Serbian folk music

1873 births
1938 deaths
Serbian composers
Musicians from Novi Sad
Serbian Esperantists
Culture of Vojvodina